This is a list of 145 species in Eubazus, a genus of braconid wasps in the family Braconidae.

Eubazus species

 Eubazus abieticola van Achterberg & Kenis, 2000 c g
 Eubazus aequator (Herrich-Schäffer, 1838) c g
 Eubazus aevenki Belokobylskij, 1994 c g
 Eubazus albicoxa Papp, 2005 c g
 Eubazus aliochinoi Belokobylskij, 1998 c g
 Eubazus antennalis Belokobylskij, 1994 c g
 Eubazus atricornis (Ashmead, 1889) c
 Eubazus atricoxa Papp, 2005 c g
 Eubazus augustinus (Reinhard, 1867) c g
 Eubazus azovicus Tobias & Perepechayenko, 1992 c g
 Eubazus bicolor (Szepligeti, 1900) c g
 Eubazus bicornis (Martin, 1956) c g
 Eubazus breviseta (Snoflak, 1953) c g
 Eubazus bucculentis (Martin, 1956) c g
 Eubazus calyptoides (Martin, 1956) c g
 Eubazus canadensis (Provancher, 1881) c
 Eubazus carinatus (Nees, 1816) c g
 Eubazus chinensis (Watanabe, 1950) c g
 Eubazus cingulatus (Szepligeti, 1896) c
 Eubazus claviventris (Reinhard, 1867) c
 Eubazus clypealis Tobias, 1986 c g
 Eubazus convexope van Achterberg, 2000 c g
 Eubazus corrugatus (Reinhard, 1867) c g
 Eubazus crabilli (Martin, 1956) c g
 Eubazus crassicornis (Brues, 1933) c g
 Eubazus crassigaster (Provancher, 1886) c g
 Eubazus cruentatus (Reinhard, 1867) c g
 Eubazus cserskii Belokobylskij, 1998 c g
 Eubazus cubiculus Papp, 1998 c g
 Eubazus curtis Belokobylskij, 1998 c g
 Eubazus danielssoni Papp, 1999 c g
 Eubazus debilis Papp, 2005 c g
 Eubazus definitus (Muesebeck, 1957) c g
 Eubazus denticlypealis (Tobias, 1986) c g
 Eubazus denticulatus (Martin, 1956) c g
 Eubazus destitutus (Ratzeburg, 1848) c g
 Eubazus discrepans Papp, 2005 c g
 Eubazus electus (Muesebeck, 1957) c g
 Eubazus elongatus van Achterberg, 2000 c g
 Eubazus eminens Papp, 2005 c g
 Eubazus eos Belokobylskij, 1994 c g
 Eubazus ernobii (Muesebeck, 1957) c g
 Eubazus evanidus (Martin, 1956) c g
 Eubazus exsertor (Reinhard, 1867) c g
 Eubazus fasciatus (Nees, 1816) c g
 Eubazus fiskei (Rohwer, 1913) c g
 Eubazus flavifacies Belokobylskij, 1998 c g
 Eubazus flavipes (Haliday, 1835) c g
 Eubazus frater Papp, 2005 c g
 Eubazus fuscipes (Herrich-Schäffer, 1838) c g
 Eubazus gallicus (Reinhard, 1867) c
 Eubazus gaullei (Granger, 1949) c g
 Eubazus gigas (Fahringer, 1925) c g
 Eubazus glabriclypealis van Achterberg, 2000 c g
 Eubazus gracilicornis (Brues, 1939) c g
 Eubazus heothinus van Achterberg, 2000 c g
 Eubazus indeprehensus (Martin, 1956) c g
 Eubazus interstitialis (Ratzeburg, 1844) c
 Eubazus involutus Belokobylskij, 1998 c g
 Eubazus iterabilis Belokobylskij, 1998 c g
 Eubazus janus Belokobylskij, 1998 c g
 Eubazus junctus Belokobylskij, 1998 c g
 Eubazus kedrovyi Belokobylskij, 1998 c g
 Eubazus lapponicus (Thomson, 1892) c g
 Eubazus latus Belokobylskij, 1998 c g
 Eubazus lepidus (Haliday, 1835) c g
 Eubazus longicauda (Curtis, 1832) c g
 Eubazus longicaudis (Ratzeburg, 1844) c g
 Eubazus longicaudus (Provancher, 1886) c g
 Eubazus longitempora Papp, 2005 c g
 Eubazus maacki Belokobylskij, 1998 c g
 Eubazus macrocephalus Nees, 1812 c g
 Eubazus macrurus (Thomson, 1892) c g
 Eubazus major (Cresson, 1872) c g
 Eubazus margaritovi Belokobylskij, 1994 c g
 Eubazus marginatus (Martin, 1956) c g
 Eubazus mexicanus (Cresson, 1872) c
 Eubazus micropilosus Belokobylskij, 1998 c g
 Eubazus micus Belokobylskij, 1998 c g
 Eubazus minutus (Ratzeburg, 1848) c g
 Eubazus natalensis (Brues, 1926) c
 Eubazus nigricoxis (Wesmael, 1835) c g
 Eubazus nigripes (Reinhard, 1867) c g
 Eubazus nigroventralis van Achterberg, 2003 c g
 Eubazus normalis (Brues, 1923) c g
 Eubazus obtusus (Snoflak, 1953) c g
 Eubazus ochyrus van Achterberg, 2000 c g
 Eubazus olegi Belokobylskij, 1994 c g
 Eubazus orchesiae (Ashmead, 1889) c g
 Eubazus orientalis (Szepligeti, 1914) c g
 Eubazus pallipes Nees, 1812 c g
 Eubazus parvulus (Reinhard, 1867) c
 Eubazus patei (Martin, 1956) c g
 Eubazus phymatodis (Ashmead, 1889) c g
 Eubazus planifacialis van Achterberg, 2003 c g
 Eubazus punctatus (Ratzeburg, 1852) c g
 Eubazus punctifer van Achterberg, 2003 c g
 Eubazus pusillus (Brullé, 1832) c g
 Eubazus pygmaeus Belokobylskij, 1998 c g
 Eubazus regularis van Achterberg, 2000 c g
 Eubazus robustus (Ratzeburg, 1844) c g
 Eubazus rotundiceps (Cresson, 1872) c g
 Eubazus ruficoxis (Wesmael, 1835) c g
 Eubazus rufithorax (Abdinbekova, 1969) c g
 Eubazus rugosus (Ratzeburg, 1848) c g
 Eubazus rugulosus Papp, 2005 c g
 Eubazus salicicola (Muesebeck, 1957) c g
 Eubazus santacheza Belokobylskij, 1998 c g
 Eubazus satai (Watanabe, 1948) c g
 Eubazus sayi (Muesebeck & Walkley, 1951) c g
 Eubazus segmentatus (Marshall, 1889) c g
 Eubazus semicastaneus (Marshall, 1893) c g
 Eubazus semirugosus (Nees, 1816) c g
 Eubazus shishiniovae van Achterberg, 2000 c g
 Eubazus shufanicus Belokobylskij, 1998 c g
 Eubazus sibiricus Belokobylskij, 1998 c g
 Eubazus sigalphoides (Marshall, 1889) c g
 Eubazus simplex Belokobylskij, 1998 c g
 Eubazus sintuchae Belokobylskij, 1998 c g
 Eubazus sochiensis Tobias, 1976 c g
 Eubazus spasskii Belokobylskij, 1998 c g
 Eubazus stanleyi (Martin, 1956) c g
 Eubazus stictopleurus (Martin, 1956) c g
 Eubazus strigitergum (Cushman, 1930) c g
 Eubazus subvagus Tobias, 1986 c g
 Eubazus sudeticus (Snoflak, 1953) c g
 Eubazus taiga Belokobylskij, 1998 c g
 Eubazus tauricus Tobias, 1986 c g
 Eubazus teres Papp, 2005 c g
 Eubazus terminalis Belokobylskij, 1998 c g
 Eubazus testaceipes (Grese, 1928) c g
 Eubazus thoracicus (Ashmead, 1894) c g
 Eubazus tibialis (Haliday, 1835) c g
 Eubazus tomoxiae (Rohwer, 1915) c g
 Eubazus topali Papp, 2005 c g
 Eubazus tricoloripes van Achterberg, 2000 c g
 Eubazus tridentatus (Martin, 1956) c g
 Eubazus trilobatus (Say, 1836) c g
 Eubazus tumorulus Papp, 2005 c g
 Eubazus vagus (Reinhard, 1867) c g
 Eubazus venturii (Schrottky, 1902) c g
 Eubazus vitripennis (Herrich-Schäffer, 1838) c g
 Eubazus vladimiri Belokobylskij, 1994 c g
 Eubazus wilmattae (Brues, 1910) c g
 Eubazus zelinensis van Achterberg, 2000 c g

This is a list of 145 species in Eubazus, a genus of braconid wasps in the family Braconidae.
Data sources: i = ITIS, c = Catalogue of Life, g = GBIF, b = Bugguide.net

References

Eubazus